SN 2006gy was an extremely energetic supernova, also referred to as a hypernova or quark-nova, that was discovered on September 18, 2006. It was first observed by Robert Quimby and P. Mondol, and then studied by several teams of astronomers using facilities that included the Chandra, Lick, and Keck Observatories. In May 2007 NASA and several of the astronomers announced the first detailed analyses of the supernova, describing it as the "brightest stellar explosion ever recorded". In October 2007 Quimby announced that SN 2005ap had broken SN 2006gy's record as the brightest-ever recorded supernova, and several subsequent discoveries are brighter still. Time magazine listed the discovery of SN 2006gy as third in its Top 10 Scientific Discoveries for 2007.

Characteristics

SN 2006gy occurred in a distant galaxy (NGC 1260), approximately 238 million light-years (73 megaparsecs) away. The energy radiated by the explosion has been estimated at 1051 ergs (1044 J), making it a hundred times more powerful than the typical supernova explosion which radiates 1049 ergs (1042 J) of energy. Although at its peak the SN 2006gy supernova was intrinsically 400 times as luminous as SN 1987A, which was bright enough to be seen by the naked eye, SN 2006gy was more than 1,400 times as far away as SN 1987A, and too far away to be seen without a telescope.

SN 2006gy is classified as a type II supernova because it showed lines of hydrogen in its spectrum, although the extreme brightness indicates that it is different from the typical type II supernova. Several possible mechanisms have been proposed for such a violent explosion, all requiring a very massive progenitor star. The most likely explanations involve the efficient conversion of explosive kinetic energy to radiation by interaction with circumstellar material, similar to a type IIn supernova but on a larger scale. Denis Leahy and Rachid Ouyed, Canadian scientists from the University of Calgary, have proposed that SN 2006gy was the birth of a quark star.

Similarity to Eta Carinae 
Eta Carinae (η Carinae or η Car) is a highly luminous hypergiant star located approximately 7,500 light-years from Earth in the Milky Way galaxy. Since Eta Carinae is 32,000 times closer than SN 2006gy, the light from it will be about a billion-fold brighter. It is estimated to be similar in size to the star which became SN 2006gy. Dave Pooley, one of the discoverers of SN 2006gy, says that if Eta Carinae exploded in a similar fashion, it would be bright enough that one could read by its light on Earth at night, and would even be visible during the daytime. SN 2006gy's apparent magnitude (m) was 15, so a similar event at Eta Carinae will have an m of about −7.5. According to astrophysicist Mario Livio, this could happen at any time, but the risk to life on Earth would be low.

References

 SIMBAD data

External links

 Light curves and spectra on the Open Supernova Catalog
 Astronomy Picture of the Day 10 May 2007
 Giant exploding star outshines previous supernovas (CNN.com)
 Space.com article on SN 2006gy.
 Star dies in brightest supernova, BBC, Tuesday, 8 May 2007, 03:35 GMT
 The Greatest Show in Space, Time magazine Thursday, May 21st, 2007 Pages 56–57 
 Supernova may offer new view of early universe
 Lick Observatory Laser Guide Star Adaptive Optics
 Image SN 2006gy

Perseus (constellation)
Supernovae
Hypernovae
20060918